Rafael Grünenfelder (born 20 March 1999) is a Liechtensteiner footballer who plays as a defender for Balzers and the Liechtenstein national team.

Career
Grünenfelder made his international debut for Liechtenstein on 25 March 2021 in a 2022 FIFA World Cup qualification match against Armenia.

Personal life
Grünenfelder was born in Vaduz, and also holds Swiss citizenship.

Career statistics

International

References

External links
 

1999 births
Living people
People from Vaduz
Liechtenstein footballers
Liechtenstein youth international footballers
Liechtenstein under-21 international footballers
Liechtenstein international footballers
Swiss men's footballers
Association football defenders
FC Balzers players
Swiss 1. Liga (football) players
2. Liga Interregional players